Laekrits, not to be confused with lakrits (Swedish for liquorice), were milk chocolate oblate spheroid-shaped candies with hard licorice candy shells. Laekrits were produced by Cloetta USA Inc., a subsidiary of Cloetta.

They were originally introduced to the US market in 1998. The name was filed for trademark protection in 1995, the trademark was registered in 1997, and re-registration after 6 years did not take place, so the trademark protection lapsed in 2004, as the procedures for maintaining the rights did not take place.

References

External links
Cloetta Fazer, Sweden
Cloetta, Sweden

Brand name confectionery
Liquorice (confectionery)